Sahaptian (also Sahaptianic, Sahaptin, Shahaptian) is a two-language branch of the Plateau Penutian family spoken by Native American peoples in the Columbia Plateau region of Washington, Oregon, and Idaho in the northwestern United States.

The terms Sahaptian (the family) and Sahaptin (the language) have often been confused and used interchangeably in the literature.

Family division
Sahaptian includes two languages:

1. Nez Perce (Niimiipuutímt)
2. Sahaptin (Sħáptənəxw)

Nez Perce has two principle dialects, Upper and Lower. Sahaptin has somewhat greater internal diversity, with its main dialects being Umatilla and Yakima.

Nodel Rude's (2012) classification of Sahaptian is as follows.
Proto-Sahaptian
Nez Perce
Sahaptin
Columbia River dialect
Northern dialect
Northwest dialect
Northeast dialect

Proto-language

Work on Proto-Sahaptian reconstruction has been undertaken by Noel Rude (2006, 2012).

Proto-Sahaptian consonants:
{| class="wikitable" style="text-align: center;"
! colspan=2 rowspan=2| !! rowspan=2| Bilabial !! colspan=3| Alveolar !! rowspan=2| Post-alveolar !! colspan=2| Velar !! colspan=2| Uvular !! rowspan=2| Glottal
|-
! plain !! lateral !! central !! plain !! labialized !! plain !! labialized
|-
! colspan=2| Stop/Affricate
| p || t || ƛ || c || č || k || kʷ || q || qʷ || ʔ
|-
! colspan=2| Ejective
| p̓ || t̓ || ƛ̓ || c̓ || č || k̓ || k̓ʷ || q̓ || q̓ʷ || 
|-
! colspan=2| Fricative
|  ||  || ł || s || š || x || xʷ || x̣ || x̣ʷ  || h
|-
! rowspan=2| Sonorant !! plain
| m || n || l ||  || y ||  || w ||  ||  || 
|-
! glottalized
| m̓ || n̓ || l̓ ||  || y̓ ||  || w̓ ||  ||  || 
|}

Proto-Sahaptian vowels:
{| class="wikitable" style="text-align: center;"
!  !! front !! central !! back
|-
! high
| i || ɨ || u
|-
! mid
|  ||  || o
|-
! low
| æ ||  || ɑ
|}

Bibliography
 Aoki, Haruo (1963). On Sahaptian-Klamath Linguistic Affiliations. International Journal of American Linguistics 29, no. 2: 107–112.
 Aoki, Haruo (1966). Nez Percé vowel harmony and proto-Sahaptian vowels. Language, 42, 759-767.
 Aoki, Haruo (1970). Nez Percé grammar. University of California publications in linguistics (Vol. 62). Berkeley: University of California Press. .
 Mithun, Marianne (1999). The languages of Native North America. Cambridge: Cambridge University Press.  (hbk); .
 Rigsby, Bruce (1965). Continuity and change in Sahaptian vowel systems. International Journal of American Linguistics, 31, 306-311.
 Rigsby, Bruce; & Silverstein, Michael (1969). Nez Percé vowels and proto-Sahaptian vowel harmony. Language, 45, 45-59.
 Rude, Noel.  (2012). Reconstructing Proto-Sahaptian Sounds. University of British Columbia Working Papers in Linguistics, Vol. 32, pp. 292–324.  Papers for the Forty-seventh International Conference on Salish and Neighbouring Languages, Cranbrook, British Columbia, Canada, August 3–5, 2012, edited by Joel Dunham, John Lyon & Natalie Weber.

References

 
Language families
Plateau Penutian languages
Indigenous languages of the North American Plateau
Indigenous languages of the United States